Ambika Bhakti Mod (born 1995/1996) is a British actress, comedian, and writer. She is best known for her role as Shruti Acharya in the BBC drama This is Going to Hurt.

Early life and education
Mod grew up in Potters Bar, Hertfordshire. She is the daughter of Indian immigrants; her mother arrived in the UK as a child, and her father arrived in his 20s. She attended Dame Alice Owen's School. She graduated with a Bachelor of Arts in English Studies from St Mary's College, Durham.

While at Durham, Mod discovered acting and sketch comedy through the university's Revue, performing at the 2015 Edinburgh Fringe Festival and serving as the troupe's President in 2017.

Career
Mod formed a duo titled Megan from HR with Andrew Shires. She performs regularly at improvised comedy theatre The Free Association in London. 

Early in her career, she worked as a personal assistant at Condé Nast as her day job while doing comedy at night.

Filmography

Stage

Awards and nominations

References

External links
 
 Megan from HR.

Year of birth missing (living people)
1990s births
Living people
21st-century English comedians
Actresses from Hertfordshire
Alumni of St Mary's College, Durham
British actresses of Indian descent
British sketch comedians
English people of Indian descent
English women comedians
People educated at Dame Alice Owen's School
People from Potters Bar
21st-century English actresses